Antony Caceres (born 31 January 2000) is a Canadian professional soccer player who plays as a midfielder.

Early life
Caceres grew up in Leduc, Alberta, just south of Edmonton. At youth level, he played for Edmonton Juventus before joining the academy of North American Soccer League side FC Edmonton.

Club career

Vancouver Whitecaps
In August 2016, he joined the academy of Major League Soccer side Vancouver Whitecaps FC. In the 2016–17 USSDA season he made 34 appearances in all competitions for the under-15/16 team, scoring eight goals. The following year, he played for the under-18/19 team, making 27 appearances and scoring four goals.

FC Edmonton
After leaving the Whitecaps program in 2018, Caceres returned to FC Edmonton. On 10 March 2020, he signed his first professional contract with the Eddies. He made his professional debut for Edmonton on August 15 against Forge FC. In November 2020 FC Edmonton announced Caceres had been re-signed for the 2021 Canadian Premier League season. On 9 February 2022, the club announced that Caceres and all but two other players would not be returning for the 2022 season.

Personal life
Caceres is of Bolivian descent.

References

External links

2000 births
Living people
Association football midfielders
Canadian soccer players
Soccer people from Alberta
People from Leduc, Alberta
Canadian people of Bolivian descent
Vancouver Whitecaps FC players
FC Edmonton players
Canadian Premier League players